Allan White (21 July 1915 – 4 August 1987) was an Australian rules footballer who played for the Fitzroy Football Club in the Victorian Football League (VFL).

Notes

External links 
		

1915 births
1987 deaths
Australian rules footballers from Victoria (Australia)
Fitzroy Football Club players